Wendehorn  is a pseudo-runic symbol resembling the Tvimadur symbol. It is allegedly a bindrune of the Man and Yr runes, symbolizing 'life' and 'death' respectively. The term is due to Guido von List's Das Geheimnis der Runen, where it does not figure as a full member of the Armanen runes, but is mentioned in the context of the crescent moon being "the rune of Freya, who promotes childbirth."
It was taken up by List's Armanist followers, such as  Rudolf John Gorsleben, and Siegfried Adolf Kummer and is still in use in Irminenschaft and Armanenschaft-inspired esotericism today (Karl Spiesberger, Karl Hans Welz, Adolf Schleipfer, Larry E. Camp<ref>Handbook of Armanen Runes by Larry E. Camp Europa Ltd.</ref>).

Karl Maria Wiligut utilised this symbol, referring to it as 'Wend-horn', in his own runic row but did not develop his runic row until 1934 and the Wendehorn is mentioned in List 1908, Gorsleben 1930 and Kummer 1932. Its earliest reference in contemporary times is in the many works of Guido von List, of which many are published before 1908.

Karl Spießberger in his 1955 Runenmagie identified it as a combination of "male Man" and "female Yr", symbolizing a hierosgamos.

The Wendehorn appears in "runic massage". 

See also
Stephen E. Flowers
Rudolf John Gorsleben
Hagal (Armanen rune)
Siegfried Adolf Kummermother!''
Karl Spiesberger
Jarl Widar

Notes

References
Spießberger, Karl - Runenmagie, 1955
von List, Guido - Das Geheimnis der Runen, 1908 (GvLB no 1)
John Gorsleben, Rudolf - Hoch-Zeit der Menschheit, 1930
Kummer, Siegfried Adolf - Heilige Runenmacht, 1932
Widar, Jarl - Whispering of Gotos - Rune-Knowledge [from Hagal 11 (1934), Heft 7, pp. 7–15]
Flowers, Dr. Stephen E. and Moynihan, Michael - The Secret King (2001)

Guido von List
Runes in Germanic mysticism